UnrealIRCd is an open-source IRC daemon, originally based on DreamForge, and is available for Unix-like operating systems and Windows. Since the beginning of development on UnrealIRCd c. May 1999, many new features have been added and modified, including advanced security features and bug fixes, and it has become a popular server.

Development
UnrealIRCd was originally based on  DALnet's DreamForge IRCd, "a now deprecated IRC server that was the predecessor to the actively maintained Bahamut server."

On July 13, 2007, Carsten V. Munk (stskeeps), the founder of the UnrealIRCd project, announced that a future v4.0 would be a fork of InspIRCd. Later on, this idea was dropped.

With the release of version 3.2.10 in December 2012, Bram Matthys (Syzop), the current project leader of UnrealIRCd, announced that development has been started on a 3.4 version. The 3.2 series will be maintained until the new version has been declared stable, which was expected to happen somewhere in 2014.
In October 2015 it was announced that due to the many changes the new series will be called UnrealIRCd 4 and the first Release Candidate was made available for download.
An UnrealIRCd 4.0.0 stable release was made on December 24, 2015.
Next UnrealIRCd 5 stable series was first released on December 13, 2019.

Features
Some of Unreal's features are referred to as "nonstandard", in that they are not listed in the IRC-related RFCs 1459 and 2811–2813, but are beneficial "from a security point of view." The software "possibly has the most security features of any IRC server", including "spam filters, different styles of user bans, various channel modes to prevent abuse and flooding, SSL (Secure Sockets Layer) connection support, and compressed server connections." For example, the shun command blocks a user from transmitting any text, the spamfilter uses regular expressions and can automatically ban, shun or disconnect users, and dccdeny can block files from being transmitted.
It includes the ability to password-protect server restart and stop commands, for operator use only. The Windows version includes error reporting on startup.  Unreal supports linking to IRC Services, and allowing Services to change channel modes.
Server-side filtering can be used by administrators to block transfers of files, or certain domains.

Unreal 3.2's "new-style" configuration file format is described as "more verbose" than traditional IRCd servers, which makes it easier set up; it is divided into "blocks" of related options, and has explanatory comments for each option.

Reception
UnrealIRCd is "one of the most popular and full-featured IRC daemons" and is used on the largest number of IRC servers, according to SearchIRC.com.
This server is described as having "possibly the most security features of any IRC server."

Security issues
The tarball of version 3.2.8.1, from November 2009 to June 12, 2010, contained a trojan that allowed people to execute commands with the privileges of the user running the daemon, regardless of any user restrictions.  The problem was fixed - the current tarball download is not suspected to contain a trojan.

The "Firefox XPS" cross-protocol JavaScript-based attack on IRC networks was reported in January 2010; UnrealIRCd developers later released a patch to set its anti-spoofing configuration parameter to "on" - the default was previously "off" - and "kill/zline/etc such connections". It is the first question in the configuration file.

See also

 Internet Relay Chat
 Comparison of IRC daemons

References

External links
 UnrealIRCd site

Internet Relay Chat daemons
1999 software